Glorietta is a former unincorporated community, now annexed to Orinda  in Contra Costa County, California. 

It lies at an elevation of 597 feet (182 m).

References

Orinda, California
Neighborhoods in Contra Costa County, California